Malcolm Macmillan may refer to:

Malcolm MacMillan (ice hockey), Canadian ice hockey player
Malcolm Macmillan, Scottish politician and journalist
 Malcolm Macmillan (psychologist) and science historian